Alexander Yakovlevich Mogilevsky (January 15(27), 1885March 7, 1953) was a classical concert violinist and director of the Kremlin Band for Tsar Nicholas II.

Career
Born in Odessa in 1885, Mogilevsky moved to Moscow in 1898 to study music at the prestigious Moscow Conservatory of Music, where he graduated first in his class.

Mogilevsky was a student, colleague, and close friend of Alexander Scriabin, with whom he traveled in 1910 on a tour arranged by the conductor Serge Koussevitzky. From 1920 to 1921 he taught at the Moscow Conservatory (among his students - D. M. Tsyganov). In the same years, he led the Stradivari State Quartet. In 1922 he began active touring abroad, taught at the Russian Conservatory in Paris.

In 1929, Mogilevsky met and married Nadezhda Nikolayevna de Leuchtenberg, who accompanied him on piano as the two started what was to be a world tour. The tour began in the Far East, with concerts in Singapore, the Dutch East Indies (now Indonesia), and Japan. Divorced in 1938.

One of Mogilevsky's more famous students were Shinichi Suzuki (whom he taught in Tokyo, ca. 1931), the inventor of the international Suzuki method of music education. and Suwa Nejiko.

He died in Japan in 1953, aged 67. In 1966, a monograph about him "The Soul of Music" by a Japanese violinist, student of Mogilevsky, Kiyoshi Kato, was published in Tokyo.

Evgeny Mogilevsky is his great nephew (grand-nephew).

Music

References

Russian classical violinists
Male classical violinists
Jewish classical violinists
Moscow Conservatory alumni
Musicians from Odesa
Pupils of Jan Hřímalý
1885 births
1953 deaths
20th-century classical violinists
20th-century Russian male musicians